Prince Peter Mikhailovich Volkonsky (1861–1948) was a Russian aristocrat.

Biography

Peter M. Volkonsky was born in 1861 in St. Petersburg. His father was Prince Michael S. Volkonsky, his mother the  Serene Princess Elizabeth G. Volkonskaia (1838–1897). He married  Princess Catherine Shahovskaya, daughter of the General of Infantry Prince Shakhovsky Aleksei Ivanovich (1821–1890) and Sofia Alexandrovna Olsufyeva (1830–1882). Their son was Prince Mikhail Petrovich Volkonsky.

Brothers

The brothers Volkonsky, each in his own way, left a bright trace in the history of Russia.

1. Vladimir Volkonsky (1868–1953), was vice-chairman of the State Duma under Volkonskye chairmanship of Khomyakov and Rodzianko and later was a Deputy Minister of Internal Affairs, "survived" in office four ministers. Nicholas II told each new minister: "Take care of Volkonsky".

2. Serge Wolkonsky (1860–1937) - was a Russian theater worker, director, writer, Chamberlain, Privy Counsellor and a Catholic convert.

3.

Life after Revolution
During World War I he worked at the front of one of the organizations the All-Russian Land Union. He was Initiator of the Petrograd Society advocates the reunification of the Churches (1917–1918). He converted to Catholicism from Russian Orthodoxy in exile in Istanbul. In 1931-1937 he worked in the archives of the Catholic Metropolitan Andrey Sheptytsky. 

At the end of life was ordained a Catholic priest. He was author of "Catholicism and the sacred tradition of the East" and others. 

He died 11 September 1948 in Paris.

References
A brief sketch of organization of the Russian Catholic Church in Russia. Lviv, 1930.
The Way of Bitterness: Soviet Russia, 1920.  London, 1931.
 Unionalnoe movement in Russia (partly published in the journal "Russia and the Universal Church» (1957 N 4; 1960, N 5-6; 1961, N 2)).

Notes

1. Volkonsky Peter M. 1861

2. Shahovsky

3. Catholic Encyclopedia - M., 2002 T. 1. — С. 1073-1074. - S. 1073-1074.

External links
Genealogical Knowledge Base: Volkonsky

Converts to Eastern Catholicism from Eastern Orthodoxy
Former Russian Orthodox Christians
Russian Eastern Catholics
Peter